Carla Berube (born September 2, 1975) is an American college basketball coach and former basketball player. She is the head coach of the Princeton Tigers women's basketball team, a position she has held since 2019. She previously spent seventeen years as the head coach of the women's basketball team at Tufts University, where she compiled a record of 384–96. Berube played college basketball for the UConn Huskies.

Playing career
Berube graduated from Oxford High School in Oxford, Massachusetts, where she played basketball, and won two state titles. She then played college basketball for Geno Auriemma at the University of Connecticut, where she scored 1,381 points and compiled a 132–8 record in four years. She was a member of the 1995 team that went 35–0, winning the school's first national championship.

Berube was selected by the New England Blizzard with the 21st selection in the 1997 ABL draft. She averaged 2.6 points in 46 games over two seasons before the league ceased operations in 1999.

Coaching career
Berube was hired by Providence College as an assistant women's basketball coach in August 2000. In 2002, she was hired to be the head coach for D3 Tufts University. Over 17 seasons, she went 384–96 with two championship game appearances and four Final Fours. She was awarded the Pat Summitt Trophy as the United States Marine Corps/Women's Basketball Coaches' Association NCAA Division III National Coach of the Year in 2015.

Berube was named head coach of the 2017 USA Women's U16 National Team and led the team to an undefeated 5–0 record and gold medal finish at the FIBA Americas U16 Championship. In 2018, Berube coached the USA Women's U17 National Team to a perfect 7–0 record and another gold medal at the FIBA U17 World Cup in Minsk, Belarus.

In 2019, Berube left Tufts to become the head coach for the Princeton Tigers. In her first year at Princeton, Berube compiled a 29–1 record, including an undefeated 14–0 record in Ivy League play, and was named Ivy League Coach of the Year.

Head coaching record

References

1975 births
Living people
American women's basketball coaches
American women's basketball players
Forwards (basketball)
New England Blizzard players
Princeton Tigers women's basketball coaches
Providence Friars women's basketball coaches
UConn Huskies women's basketball players
Tufts Jumbos women's basketball coaches